The 1932 Vanderbilt Commodores football team represented Vanderbilt University in the 1932 Southern Conference football season. The 1932 season was Dan McGugin's 28th year as head coach. Pete Gracey was All-American.

Schedule

References

Vanderbilt
Vanderbilt Commodores football seasons
Vanderbilt Commodores football